Mud Pond, also known as Mud Lake, is a lake located near Sunapee in Sullivan County within the U.S. state of New Hampshire.

References

Lakes of Sullivan County, New Hampshire